The 1999 season was the Dallas Cowboys' 40th in the National Football League (NFL) and second under head coach Chan Gailey. The Cowboys were looking to return to the playoffs, improve on their 10–6 record from the previous season and head to the Super Bowl for the final time in the 1990s. 

While the Cowboys were unable to repeat as division champions or match their win total from 1998, their 8–8 record enabled them to qualify for the playoffs as a wild-card team. The Cowboys lost to the Minnesota Vikings, ending their season in the opening round of the playoffs for a second consecutive year. 

Gailey was fired at the end of the season. The Cowboys would not return to the playoffs until 2003.

Offseason

NFL Draft

Hall of Fame Game
 Cleveland Browns 20, Dallas Cowboys 17 (Overtime)

Regular season
The season began at Washington with a come-from-behind victory over the division-rival Washington Redskins. Trailing by three touchdowns entering the fourth quarter, they rallied to tie the game. Then free agent acquisition Raghib Ismail hauled in the winning touchdown catch in overtime while Troy Aikman threw for a franchise-record five touchdowns in a single game (since matched by Tony Romo).

The team started with a 3–0 record, but a week 5 injury to wide receiver Michael Irvin against the Philadelphia Eagles eventually forced him into retirement. Afterwards, Dallas struggled down the stretch as age and injury began to take their toll. The team again made the playoffs despite an 8–8 season, but lost once more in the first round to the Minnesota Vikings. Despite leading the team to consecutive playoff berths and seemingly re-igniting the Dallas offense, head coach Chan Gailey was fired by owner Jerry Jones after the season.

A notable addition to the team was fan favorite linebacker Dat Nguyen, the only (to date) Vietnamese-American to play in the NFL.

This marked the final season for future Hall of Famer Michael Irvin and longtime Cowboys fullback Daryl Johnston. Irvin and Johnston both suffered season-ending (and as it turned out career-ending) injuries early in the season. Irvin was the last Cowboys player to have played for Tom Landry.

The annual Thanksgiving Day game featured the return of former Cowboys head coach Jimmy Johnson to Texas Stadium as Miami Dolphins head coach. It was the only game Johnson ever coached in Texas Stadium as a visiting coach. The Cowboys won 20–0.

The Cowboys lost four games in which their defense only yielded 13 points in each contest.

Schedule

Note: Intra-division opponents are in bold text.

Standings

Playoffs

Roster

Publications
The Football Encyclopedia 
Total Football 
Cowboys Have Always Been My Heroes

References

External links
 
 Pro Football Hall of Fame
 Dallas Cowboys Official Site

Dallas Cowboys seasons
Dallas
Dallas